The Nepal–India border is an open international boundary running between the Nepal and the India. The current border was delimited after the Sugauli treaty of 1816 between Nepal and the British Raj. Following Indian independence, the prevailin border was recognised as the international border between the Kingdom of Nepal and the Dominion of India.

Description
The border starts in the west at the western tripoint with China near the Limpuyadhura. It then proceeds to the south-west through the Himalayas, the Sivalik Hills and then the Gangetic plain, initially overland and then utilising the Mahakali River. Just east of Majhola it turns to the south-east and proceeds in that direction overland, occasionally utilising various rivers and hill crests. North-west of Islampur the border turns to the north-east and proceeds overland to the eastern Chinese tripoint.

History

The border region has historically existed at the edge of various Indian and Nepali kingdoms. It took its modern shape during the period of British rule in India which began in the 17th century. During the late 18th century the Nepali kingdom launched an expansion drive, bringing them into conflict with the British and resulting in the Anglo-Nepalese War (1814–16). Nepal was defeated, and by the Treaty of Sugauli it was forced to cede large areas of land to Britain, effectively creating the modern India-Nepal boundary. Finding the Terai region difficult to manage, the British returned parts of it to Nepal in 1816.

India gained independence in 1947, and three years later it signed a friendship treaty with Nepal, by which both countries agreed to respect the territorial integrity of the other. Since then relations have largely been cordial, though a number of border disputes remain. There have also been occasional blockades on the border at times of tension, for example in 1987 and 2015.

Communities living in India and Nepal close to the Indo-Nepal border have usually shared old, customary ties of kinship and resource access with communities across the border, such as along the western part of the Indo-Nepal border, in the Mahakali valley.

Border disputes

There are two existing territorial disputes between India and Nepal, over the Kalapani territory, a  area at the India–Nepal–China trijunction in North West Nepal, and Susta, a – area in Southern Nepal.

Border crossings
There are several major border crossings that the Indian Integrated Check Posts (ICP) use for processing cargo customs and immigration entry for citizens of third countries. These are, from west to east:
 Banbasa in Champawat district, Uttarakhand, India - Kanchanpur District, Sudurpashchim Province, Nepal
 Rupaidiha in Bahraich district, Uttar Pradesh - Nepalganj in Banke District, Nepal
 Sonauli in Maharajganj district, Uttar Pradesh, India - Belahia, Siddharthanagar in Rupandehi District, Nepal
 Raxaul in East Champaran district, Bihar, India - Birgunj, Nepal (also known as the 'Gateway of Nepal') 
Bhitthamore in Sitamarhi district, Bihar, India - Malibara, Jaleshwar in Mahottari District, Nepal
 Jogbani in Araria district, Bihar, India - Biratnagar, Nepal
 Panitanki in Darjeeling district, West Bengal, India - Kakarbhitta, Nepal

Since there are no fences along the border there are several smaller official and unofficial border crossings. Smaller official border crossings are known as Chhoti Bhansar (Minor Customs) in the Nepali language. These are, from west to east (by Indian state):

Uttarakhand
 Jhulaghat in Pithoragarh district  - Mahakali in Baitadi District, Nepal

Uttar Pradesh
 Gauriphanta in Lakhimpur Kheri district - Dhangadi, Nepal
 Murtiha in Lakhimpur Kheri district - Gulariya, Bardiya, Nepal
 Tal Baghaura in Shravasti district - Laxmanpur, Nepal
 Tulsipur in Balrampur district - Koilabas, Nepal
 Barhani Bazar in Siddharthnagar district - Krishnanagar, Nepal

Bihar
 Bhikhna Thori in West Champaran district - Thori in Parsa District, Nepal
Bhitthamore in Sitamarhi district, Bihar - Jaleshwor in Mahottari District, Nepal
 Pipraun in Madhubani district - Jatahi-Nagarain in Dhanusa District, Nepal
 Bhimnagar in Supaul district - Bhantabari-Haripur in Sunsari District, Nepal (via Kosi barrage)
 Amgachhi in Araria district - Rangeli in Morang District, Nepal 
 Baria (Bairia bazar) in Kishanganj district - Gauriganj in Jhapa District, Nepal
 Bairgania in Sitamarhi district - Gaur in Rautahat District, Nepal
 Sonbarsa in Sitamarhi district - Malangwa in Sarlahi District, Nepal
Jainagar in Madhubani district - Inarwa Phulbariya in Saptari District, Nepal
Laukaha in Madhubani district - Thadi in Bhagwanpur near Lahan Mulcipality in Siraha District of Nepal. 

West Bengal
 Mirik in Darjeeling district - Pashupatinagar, Ilam, Nepal

Cross-border railway lines

8 railway lines between India and Nepal either exist or they are under construction or planning as follows (listed east to west):

 Babaganj-Nepalganj line - complete and operational:
 Barhani-Kathmandu line - under planning:
 Barhani-Kapilvastu line - under planning:
 Nautanwa-Bhairwa line - under planning:
 Raxaul-Kathmandu line - under planning:
 Jaynagar-Bardibas railway line - mostly complete, except final and third phase (as of April 2022): 52 km out of total 68 km complete as of April 2022 while remaining is awaiting land acquisition.
 Jogbanu-Biratnagar railway line - mostly complete, except 8 km long under construction section (as of April 2022): total 18.6 km.
 Kakarbhitta-New Jalpaiguri railway line - under planning:

Border security
The Nepal–India border is relatively peaceful. Nepali and Indian nationals do not need passports or visas to enter each other's countries, and tens of thousands of people cross the border every day for tourism and commerce.

The Indian side of the border is regulated by Sashastra Seema Bal (SSB) along with local police. The Nepali side of the border is regulated by the Armed Police Force (APF) along with the local branch of Nepal Police. Often SSB (India) and APF (Nepal) perform joint patrols on the border.

On a local level, Indian and Nepali district officials meet regularly to discuss security challenges and other issues on their respective border portions. Such meetings are usually attended by District Magistrates, local SSB representatives, customs chiefs from India including the Chief District Officer (CDO), local APF, Police and custom chiefs from Nepal.

See also 
 India–Nepal relations

References 

 
Borders of India
Borders of Nepal
International borders